Jean-Michel Cau (born 27 October 1980) is a French former footballer who played as a forward. He played in the lower divisions of French football and played in the Football League for Darlington.

Cau was born in Ajaccio, Corsica, and began his career as a youngster with his hometown club, Gazélec Ajaccio. He moved to mainland France with Istres  before returning to Gazélec in 1999, for whom he made nine appearances in the Championnat National over two seasons. In March 2001, he signed for English Football League club Darlington. He made just one appearance, as a substitute. He was introduced during the second half of a 1–1 draw with Leyton Orient in the Third Division on 30 March 2001, and according to the News of the World match report, "his only contribution was to get booked for a 62nd-minute foul". He returned to Corsica with Porto Vecchio before rejoining Gazélec Ajaccio in 2003.

References

1980 births
Living people
Sportspeople from Ajaccio
French footballers
Association football forwards
Gazélec Ajaccio players
FC Istres players
Darlington F.C. players
Championnat National players
English Football League players
French expatriate footballers
Expatriate footballers in England
Footballers from Corsica